Mirrors is the second full-length album by American-Canadian metalcore band Misery Signals. It was released through Ferret Records on August 22, 2006. It is the first album to feature new vocalist Karl Schubach, who joined the band after previous vocalist Jesse Zaraska left.

Overview
During touring for the band's debut album, Of Malice and the Magnum Heart, tension started to form between vocalist Jesse Zaraska and the other members. Once touring for the album was completed, Zaraska was asked to leave the band. Zaraska would return to Edmonton and form the post-rock band Sleeping Girl with members of his former band Compromise. He would be replaced by Karl Schubach. Schubach was chosen after the band posted an instrumental song online, inviting fans to write lyrics and perform vocals for the song.

The chorus of "One Day I'll Stay Home" features guest vocals from Patrick Stump of Fall Out Boy.

Track listing

Personnel
Misery Signals
 Karl Schubach – lead vocals
 Ryan Morgan – lead guitar, backing vocals
 Stuart Ross – rhythm guitar
 Kyle Johnson – bass
 Branden Morgan – drums

Additional
 Patrick Stump – clean vocals on "One Day I'll Stay Home"
 Ben Schigel – producer, engineer, mixing
 Sons of Nero – artwork
 Ryan Russell – photographs

References

External links
Misery Signals' official website 
Misery Signals on Myspace

2006 albums
Misery Signals albums
Ferret Music albums
Albums with cover art by Sons of Nero